Giuseppi or Giuseppe Angelini may refer to:
 Giuseppi Angelini (sculptor) (1735–1811), Italian sculptor active in Rome
 Giuseppe Angelini (bishop) (1810–1876), Italian bishop
 Giuseppe Angelini (painter) (c. 1675–1751),Italian painter